The Euaesthetinae are a subfamily of the Staphylinidae (Coleoptera). These rove beetles have slender antennae  with two or three apical antennomeres forming a loose club. The tarsi have 4-4-4 or 5-5-5 (5-5-4 in some exotic genera) segments.  They are found in forest litter. Five genera and 22 species known from North America.

References

Further reading
Herman, L.H. 2001: Catalog of the Staphylinidae (Insecta, Coleoptera): 1758 to the end of the second millennium. IV. Staphylinine group (part 1) Euaesthetinae, Leptotyphlinae, Megalopsidiinae, Oxyporinae, Pseudopsinae, Solieriinae, Steninae. Bulletin of the American Museum of Natural History, (265): 1807–2440. 
Newton, A. F., Jr., M. K. Thayer, J. S. Ashe, and D. S. Chandler. 2001. 22. Staphylinidae Latreille, 1802. p. 272–418. In: R. H. Arnett, Jr., and M. C. Thomas (eds.). American beetles, Volume 1. CRC Press; Boca Raton, FL. ix + 443 p.

External links

 Euaesthetinae at Bugguide.net. 

Staphylinidae
Polyphaga subfamilies